This is a list of educational institutions in the Philippines arranged according to the dates of their foundation. It comprises the list of the oldest schools in the Philippines sorted in various categories, and gives an overview of the development of education and higher learning in the Philippines. To be included in this list, an institution must satisfy a traditional definition of a formal educational institution at the time of its founding.

The oldest universities, colleges, vocational schools and the first modern public education system in Asia were created during the Spanish colonial period. The earliest schools were founded by Spanish Catholic missionaries. By the time Spain was replaced by the United States as the colonial power, Filipinos were among the most educated subjects in all of Asia.

Dispute over the oldest school

The title of the oldest in the Philippines have been topic for debate between two educational institutions: the University of Santo Tomas and the University of San Carlos.

The University of Santo Tomas, established in 1611 as the Colegio de Nuestra Señora del Santisimo Rosario, is the oldest university in the Philippines. In 1935 the Commonwealth government of the Philippines through the Historical Research and Markers Committee declared that UST was "oldest university under the American flag." In the 1990s, the Intramuros Administration installed a marker on the original site of the University of Santo Tomas with the recognition that the university is the "oldest university in Asia." In 2011 Pope Benedict XVI recognized UST as "the oldest institution of Catholic higher education in the Far East," while in 2012 the National Historical Commission of the Philippines published an online article recognizing UST as "Asia’s Oldest University".

However, University of San Carlos has opposed this recognition and claims that it is older than the University of Santo Tomas by 16 years by tracing its roots to the Colegio de San Ildefonso (established 1595). In 1995, University of San Carlos celebrated its Quadricentennial (400th Anniversary).

UST as Asia's Oldest University 
Numerous scholars and official government bodies have reviewed the case. In 2010, the National Historical Commission of the Philippines installed a bronze marker declaring USC's foundation late in the 18th Century, effectively disproving any direct connection with the Colegio de San Ildefonso. According to Dr. Victor Torres of the De La Salle University, the University of San Carlos' claim dates back to 1948 only when USC was declared a university. Fidel Villarroel from the University of Santo Tomas argued that USC only took over the facility of the former Colegio de San Ildefonso and that there is no 'visible' and 'clear' link between San Carlos and San Ildefonso. Aloysius Cartagenas (a Cebuano), in a paper published by Philippiniana Sacra, stated that the correct foundation year of USC is 1867, and not 1595, while in 2012 the National Historical Commission of the Philippines cemented its previous position when it published an online article recognizing UST as "Asia’s Oldest University.

Oldest educational institutions

Oldest educational institutions in continuous operation

Oldest educational institutions for girls

Oldest public educational institutions

Educational institutions with the oldest university charters

Oldest seminaries

Oldest law schools

Oldest schools of medicine

Oldest normal schools

Oldest schools of engineering

References

See also
 Education in the Philippines
 Education in the Philippines during Spanish rule
 Education in the Philippines during American rule
 Higher education in the Philippines
 Medical education in the Philippines
 Legal education in the Philippines
 List of universities and colleges in the Philippines
 List of Catholic universities and colleges in the Philippines

History of education in the Philippines
Lists of schools in the Philippines
Philippines
Philippines
Philippines
Oldest schools